Michał Pawlik (born 8 May 1995) is a Polish professional footballer who plays as a defensive midfielder for Górnik Łęczna.

Club career
On 11 August 2020, he joined GKS Bełchatów on a one-year contract. On 26 July 2022, he joined Swedish Superettan side Västerås SK.

References

External links
 
 

1995 births
Living people
People from Ryki
Sportspeople from Lublin Voivodeship
Association football midfielders
Polish footballers
Poland youth international footballers
Polish expatriate footballers
Ekstraklasa players
I liga players
Norwegian First Division players
Superettan players
Jagiellonia Białystok players
Ullensaker/Kisa IL players
Chrobry Głogów players
GKS Bełchatów players
Odra Opole players
Västerås SK Fotboll players
Górnik Łęczna players
Polish expatriate sportspeople in Norway
Expatriate footballers in Norway
Polish expatriate sportspeople in Sweden
Expatriate footballers in Sweden